Mazhar Kaleem (Urdu: مظہر کلیم) (1942 – 2018) was a Pakistani novelist chiefly known in Imran Series, Urdu spy fiction written within Imran Series mythos created by Ibn-e-Safi.

He was known for writing the Imran Series and had written short stories for children as well. He was the anchorperson of a saraiki radio talk show from Radio Multan, "Jamhoor-de-Awaz".  He was a lawyer who was elected Senior Vice-President of Multan Bar Council.

In "his writing career of over five decades, he has written around 600 spy fiction novels", as well as "around 5000 short stories for children including the famous series of Umro Aiyyar."

Biography

Mazhar was born to Mr. Hamid Yar Khan who was a Police officer. He did his B.A. from Emerson College and did M.A. (Urdu) from the Multan Campus of Punjab University.
Mazhar Kaleem was born on 22 July 1942 in Multan. His father Hamid Yar Khan was a retired police Inspector. He belonged to a Pathan family, "Muhammad Zai" in Multan, who settled in Multan after migrating from Afghanistan in the late 19th century. His original name is Mazhar Nawaz Khan; however he is now only known as his literary pen name, Mazhar Kaleem Khan.

He studied in Islamia high school Multan and graduated from Emerson College (Current Government College) . He was a color holder in basketball and bodybuilding from Emerson College. After graduating he taught as a master in a government high school, Daulat Gate, but he left it to pursue more studies at the University of Multan (currently Bahauddin Zakariya University) to do his M.A. in Urdu Literature and LL.B. He was a senior lawyer in Multan Bench of Lahore High Court. Professionally he was a lawyer and not a novelist which was his part-time hobby. He was also anchor person of a radio talk show from Radio Multan. His original name is Mazhar Nawaz Khan while Kaleem is his literary adoption. He had two sons and four daughters but his eldest son Faisal Jan died at the age of 31. The second son Fahad Usman Khan is working in a Multinational Bank.

Mazhar Kaleem is a contemporary of Ibn-e-Safi in writing Imran series and he just used the few principal characters but always had a different style. While many writers notably Safdar Shaheen & Ibne-Rahat tried to cash in on the popularity of Imran he is unparalleled now as undisputed master of writing Imran Series. He has written over four hundred novels and has introduced new style of spy novels writing. Almost every grown up person in Pakistan who had been fond of reading has read one or more of his novels. He was based in Multan.

Works
He has written over five hundred books in Imran Series both mystery long and short novels of Imran Series and short stories for children.

Stories 

 Action Agency

 Basashi
 Be Jurm
 Black Sun
 Black Feather
 Blue Eye
 Double White
 Dus Crore May Dou Shetaan
 Fohag International
 Gang war
 Hawk Eye
 HaaraKari
 Kamran Mission 
 Limelight 
 Sabolat
 Safli Dunya
 Shogi Pama
 Silver Girl
 Terntola
 Weather boss
 Asadam
Chief Agent
Dashing Agent

See also
 Imran Series By Mazhar Kaleem
 Pakishia Secret Service

References

1942 births
2018 deaths
Pakistani writers
Pakistani spy fiction writers
Urdu-language fiction writers
People from Multan
Pashtun people
Government Emerson College alumni